Store Bjørnevatn is a lake in the municipality of Valle in Agder county, Norway.

See also
List of lakes in Norway

References

Lakes of Agder
Valle, Norway